Vincentas Sladkevičius, M.I.C. (20 August 1920 – 28 May 2000) was a Lithuanian Cardinal of the Roman Catholic Church. He served as Archbishop of Kaunas from 1989 to 1996, and was elevated to the cardinalate in 1988.

Biography
Vincentas Sladkevičius was born in Žasliai, Kaišiadorys, to Mykolas Sladkevičius and his wife Uršule Kavaliauskaite. He was the youngest of five children, his siblings being named Ona, Emilija, Jonas and Marija. After studying at the Kaunas Priest Seminary and Theological Faculty in Kaunas, Sladkevičius was ordained to the priesthood on 25 March 1944. He then did pastoral work in Kaišiadorys until 1959, including serving as a professor and the prefect of studies and discipline at the Kaunas seminary.

On 14 November 1957, Sladkevičius was appointed Auxiliary Bishop sedi datus of Kaišiadorys and Titular Bishop of Abora. He received his episcopal consecration on the following 25 December from Bishop Teofilius Matulionis. However, Bishop Sladkevičius was impeded from performing his ministry by his country's Communist government, and he took up residence at Nemunėlio Radviliškis, where he was under virtual house arrest from 1963 to 1982. He was named Apostolic Administrator ad nutum Sanctae Sedis of Kaišiadorys on 15 July 1982, and became President of the Lithuanian Episcopal Conference on 27 April 1988.

Pope John Paul II created Sladkevičius Cardinal Priest of Spirito Santo alla Ferratella in the consistory of 28 June 1988, and later Archbishop of Kaunas on 10 March 1989. In 1993 he entered the Congregation of the Marian Clerics of the Immaculate Conception. He resigned as Kaunas' archbishop on 4 May 1996. He was awarded the Order of Vytautas the Great in 1998.

Sladkevičius died in Kaunas, at age 79. He was buried in the Cathedral-Basilica of Kaunas following a funeral Mass there on 1 June 2000.

References

External links 
Cardinals of the Holy Roman Church
Catholic-Hierarchy 

1920 births
2000 deaths
People from Kaišiadorys District Municipality
Lithuanian cardinals
20th-century Roman Catholic archbishops in Lithuania
Lithuanian anti-communists
Cardinals created by Pope John Paul II
Congregation of Marian Fathers of the Immaculate Conception
Archbishops of Kaunas